Jonestown is an unincorporated community in Helt Township, Vermillion County, in the U.S. state of Indiana.

History
Jonestown was laid out in about 1862 by Philip Jones, who gave the town his name. A post office called Jones was established in 1862. In 1867, the post office was transferred to Saint Bernice.

Geography
Jonestown is located less than a mile east of the larger town of Saint Bernice.

References

Unincorporated communities in Vermillion County, Indiana
Unincorporated communities in Indiana
Terre Haute metropolitan area